Marwan Sayedeh (born Latakia, Syria) is a Syrian footballer. He played as a striker, wearing the number 30 jersey for Sabah FA.

Club career
Sayedeh is Syrian Premier League 2009 Champion and Syrian Cup 2009 winner with Al-Karamah.
He was a part of Al-Karamah's squad in the 2009 AFC Cup.

Honours

Club
Al-Karamah
Syrian Premier League (1): 2008–09
Syrian Cup (1): 2008–09

References

External links
 Profile Goal.com
 Profile kooora.com (Arabic)

1983 births
Living people
People from Latakia
Syrian footballers
Association football forwards
Syrian expatriate footballers
Expatriate footballers in Indonesia
Syrian expatriate sportspeople in Indonesia
Liga 1 (Indonesia) players
Hutteen Latakia players
Taliya SC players
Al-Karamah players
Pelita Bandung Raya players
PSM Makassar players
Gresik United players
Expatriate footballers in Malaysia
Syrian expatriate sportspeople in Malaysia
Syrian Premier League players